Folke Georg "Pytta" Janson (23 April 1897 – 18 July 1965) was a Swedish athlete who specialized in the triple jump. He competed at the 1920 and 1924 Olympics and finished in second and fifth place, respectively.

Folke Jansson won seven Swedish triple jump titles, in 1917 and 1919–24, and held the Swedish record from 1918 to 1931; in 1921 he also won the Amateur Athletic Association of England championships. He worked as an insurance clerk in Gothenburg.

References

1897 births
1965 deaths
Swedish male triple jumpers
Olympic silver medalists for Sweden
Athletes (track and field) at the 1920 Summer Olympics
Athletes (track and field) at the 1924 Summer Olympics
Olympic athletes of Sweden
Medalists at the 1920 Summer Olympics
Olympic silver medalists in athletics (track and field)
Sportspeople from Jönköping